Edward John Purcell (15 June 1896 – 10 May 1933) was an Australian rules football player at the Fitzroy Football Club in the Victorian Football League (VFL). He became a premiership player at Fitroy, playing in the 1916 VFL Grand Final, under the captaincy of Wally Johnson, with George Holden as coach. Purcell made his debut against  in Round 1 of the 1916 VFL season, at Princes Park.

References

External links
 
 

1896 births
1933 deaths
Fitzroy Football Club players
Fitzroy Football Club Premiership players
Australian rules footballers from Victoria (Australia)
One-time VFL/AFL Premiership players